The Hixville Village Historic District is a historic district in Dartmouth, Massachusetts.

The intersections of North Hixville Road and Old Fall River Roads, the historic cemetery, The North Hixville Road Fire Station, Cornell Pond on the Copicut River, Hixville General Convienence Store and The First Church of Hixville define the center of Hixville Village in North Dartmouth, Massachusetts.  This area was listed on the National Register of Historic Places in 1991.

The term "Hixville" generally refers to the north-northwestern section in North Dartmouth, Massachusetts north of Interstate 195 along North Hixville Road, Hixville Road, Reed Road, Old Fall River Road, Collins Corner Road, and Flag Swamp Roads.

The boundaries of Hixville extend to the Westport border to the west, Fall River and Freetown to the North-West and north, the woods between Collins Corner and Flagg Swamp Roads (going south from the Collins Corner/Flagg Swamp Road Intersection) and the woods between the Shingle Island River and Harry M. Renyolds Drive along Old Fall River Road (going east–west) to the east, and Interstate 195 to the south.

See also
National Register of Historic Places listings in Bristol County, Massachusetts

References

Historic districts in Bristol County, Massachusetts
Dartmouth, Massachusetts
National Register of Historic Places in Bristol County, Massachusetts
Historic districts on the National Register of Historic Places in Massachusetts